Vesiculaphis caricis, is an aphid in the superfamily Aphidoidea in the order Hemiptera. It is a true bug and sucks sap from plants.

References 

 http://animaldiversity.org/accounts/Vesiculaphis_caricis/classification/
 https://www.itis.gov/servlet/SingleRpt/SingleRpt?search_topic=TSN&search_value=200692
 http://aphid.aphidnet.org/Vesiculaphis_caricis.php
 http://www.aphidsonworldsplants.info/d_APHIDS_V.htm
 http://aphid.speciesfile.org/Common/basic/Taxa.aspx?TaxonNameID=1166742

Macrosiphini
Agricultural pest insects